Mohammad Mohiuddin (born 5 February 1977) is an Indian former cricketer. He played five first-class matches for Hyderabad between 1994 and 1999.

See also
 List of Hyderabad cricketers

References

External links
 

1977 births
Living people
Indian cricketers
Hyderabad cricketers
Cricketers from Hyderabad, India